Sør-Odal is a municipality in Innlandet county, Norway. It is located in the traditional district of Odalen. The administrative centre of the municipality is the village of Skarnes. Other villages in Sør-Odal include Disenå and Sander.

The  municipality is the 207th largest by area out of the 356 municipalities in Norway. Sør-Odal is the 131st most populous municipality in Norway with a population of 7,978.

General information
The parish of Søndre Odalen was established as a municipality on 1 January 1838 (see formannskapsdistrikt law). The borders of the municipality have not changed since that time.

Name
The municipality is named after the valley in which it is located. The last element is the old district name Odalen. The prefix "Sør-" was added when the old Odalen parish was divided in 1819 into Nordre Odalen in the north and Søndre Odalen in the south. Later, spelling reforms changed the names to Nord-Odal and Sør-Odal.

Coat of arms
The coat of arms was granted on 10 January 1992. The arms show three gold keys on a red background. They represent the three parishes of Oppstad, Strøm, and Ullern and the three local bodies of water: Glomma, Oppstadåa, and Storsjøen. The keys symbolize justice, knowledge, and positive ideals. The arms were designed by Harald Hallstensen.

Churches
The Church of Norway has three parishes within the municipality of Sør-Odal. It is part of the Solør, Vinger og Odal prosti (deanery) in the Diocese of Hamar.

Geography
The municipality is a rural area in the Odalen valley that is located along the river Glåma and around the southern side of the lake Storsjøen. It is bordered by the municipalities of Eidskog in the south, by Kongsvinger in the east, and by Nord-Odal and Grue in the north. The terrain is dominated by rolling hills, lakes, and pine forests.

Government
All municipalities in Norway, including Sør-Odal, are responsible for primary education (through 10th grade), outpatient health services, senior citizen services, unemployment and other social services, zoning, economic development, and municipal roads. The municipality is governed by a municipal council of elected representatives, which in turn elects a mayor.  The municipality falls under the Romerike og Glåmdal District Court and the Eidsivating Court of Appeal.

Municipal council
The municipal council  of Sør-Odal is made up of 27 representatives that are elected to four year terms. The party breakdown of the council is as follows:

Economy

The economy is based on a mix of manufacturing, farming, and services. Skarnes has a train connection to Oslo via the Kongsvingerbanen railway line.

Notable residents

 Hans Glad Bloch (1791 in Sør-Odal – 1865) a Norwegian military officer and government official
 Peder Sather (1810 in Odal – 1886) American banker and philanthropist, eponym of the Sather Tower & Sather Gate at UC Berkeley
 Magnhild Haalke (1885–1984) a Norwegian novelist and teacher for 30 years in Sør-Odal 
 Kåre Tveter (1922 in Sør-Odal – 2012) a Norwegian painter and illustrator
 Ole A. Stang Jr. (1923 in Sør-Odal – 1998) businessman, owned and ran Maarud AS
 Øystein Sunde (born 1947) folk singer, guitarist and songwriter; brought up in Skarnes
 Martin Linnes (born 1991 in Sander) a footballer with over 240 club caps and 27 for Norway
 Kent Håvard Eriksen (born 1991 in Skarnes) a footballer with over 250 club caps

Sister cities
Sør-Odal has sister city agreements with the following places:
  Viitasaari, Länsi-Suomi, Finland

Media gallery

References

External links

Municipal fact sheet from Statistics Norway 

 
Municipalities of Innlandet
1838 establishments in Norway